Du Li (born 5 March 1982 in Yiyuan, Zibo, Shandong) is a female Chinese sport shooter who was a gold medalist at the 2004 Olympics and the 2008 Olympics; she has also won titles at World Cup, World Championships and the Asian Games.

Career
Du Li competed in the 2004 Summer Olympics, where she won the gold medal in the women's 10 metre air rifle competition. She has achieved the maximum 400 in this event twice (2003 and 2006). She was unable to defend that title in the 2008 Summer Olympics, losing to Kateřina Emmons on August 9, 2008, and finishing 5th in the 2008 Summer Olympics. However, she fought back to win a gold medal in the women's 50 metre rifle three positions competition, setting a new Olympic record in the process.

In the 2016 Summer Olympics, Du Li set a new Olympic record in women's 10 metre rifle in qualification rounds by scoring 420.7. She later won a silver medal on 6 August 2016 after being second to Virginia Thrasher in the final.

Personal life
On November 29, 2009, Du married fellow Chinese Olympic shooting champion Pang Wei in Baoding, Hebei.

References

External links
 
 

1982 births
Living people
Sport shooters from Shandong
ISSF rifle shooters
Olympic gold medalists for China
2016 Olympic silver medalists for China
Olympic bronze medalists for China
Olympic shooters of China
Sportspeople from Zibo
Shooters at the 2004 Summer Olympics
Shooters at the 2008 Summer Olympics
Shooters at the 2012 Summer Olympics
Shooters at the 2016 Summer Olympics
World record holders in shooting
Olympic medalists in shooting
Asian Games medalists in shooting
Medalists at the 2004 Summer Olympics
Medalists at the 2008 Summer Olympics
Shooters at the 2002 Asian Games
Shooters at the 2006 Asian Games
Chinese female sport shooters
Asian Games gold medalists for China
Medalists at the 2002 Asian Games
Medalists at the 2006 Asian Games
21st-century Chinese women